HD 69830 b is a Neptune-mass or super-Earth-mass exoplanet orbiting the star HD 69830. It is at least 10 times more massive than Earth. It also orbits very close to its parent star and takes 82/3 days to complete an orbit.

Based on theoretical modeling in the 2006 discovery paper, this is likely to be a rocky planet, not a gas giant. However, other work has found that if it had formed as a gas giant, it would have stayed that way, and it is now understood that planets this massive are rarely rocky.

If HD 69830 b is a terrestrial planet, models predict that tidal heating would produce a heat flux at the surface of about 55 W/m2. This is 20 times that of Io.

References

HD 69830
Exoplanets discovered in 2006
Exoplanets detected by radial velocity
Hot Neptunes